Alpha-hemoglobin-stabilizing protein is a protein that in humans is encoded by the ERAF gene.

References

Further reading